Elections to Cumbria County Council were held on 6 May 1993. This was on the same day as other UK county council elections. The whole council of 83 members was up for election and the council remained under no overall control.

Results

References

Cumbria
1993
1990s in Cumbria